This list of Cambodian actors is incomplete. The list consists of Cambodian actors particularly from the 1950s through the present-day.

B
 Norodom Buppha Devi (1960s)

D
Danh Monica (2001–present)
Dy Saveth (1962-1975, 1993–present)

H
Hin Channiroth (2007–present)
Huy Yaleng (2000s)

K
Keo Pich Pisey (2000s)
Kong Som Eun (1960s and 1970s)

M
Mak Sensonita (2010–present)
Mean Sonyta (2009–present)

O
Ompor Thevy/Ampor Tevi (1980s and 1990s)

P
Peng Phan (1990s)
Pisith Pilika (1980s and 1990s)
Preap Sovath (2000s)

S
Saksi Sbong (1960s and 1970s)
Saom Vansodany (1960s and 1970s)
Norodom Sihanouk

T
Tep Rundaro (1980s-present)

V
Vann Vannak (1960s and 1970s)
Veth Rattana (2000s)
Vichara Dany (1960s-1970s)
Virak Dara (1960s and 1970s)

Y
 Yeun Savuth (2014–present)

 
Film actors
Lists of film actors
Lists of actors by ethnicity